Edward Burnham Burling (February 1, 1870 – September 3, 1966) was a prominent American lawyer and the named partner of the Washington, D.C.-based law firm of Covington & Burling.

Biography
He grew up in Eldora, Iowa and worked in a grocery store at age eleven, and went on to Grinnell College and then to Harvard Law School. After graduation, he returned to the Midwest to practice in Chicago for almost 25 years.

Later he came to Washington as general counsel for the United States Shipping Board where he was introduced to Harry Covington. They established the law firm on January 1, 1919.

In the 1940s, Burling was one of the core group brought together by Paul Nitze and Christian Herter to establish the School of Advanced International Studies at Johns Hopkins University. Mr. Burling served on the School's Advisory Council until his death in 1966. The Chair of International Law and Organizations is named after him since 1972.

See also
Scott's Run Nature Preserve – previously under his ownership

References

Further reading

External links
 A Brief Historical Note
 BURLING (Soundex B645)
 Burling Library

1870 births
1966 deaths
People from Eldora, Iowa
Harvard Law School alumni
Johns Hopkins University people
20th-century American lawyers
Lawyers from Washington, D.C.
People associated with Covington & Burling
Grinnell College alumni